Ben and Charlie (also known as Amigo, Stay Away and Humpty Dumpty Gang; original title Amico, stammi lontano almeno un palmo) is a 1972 Spaghetti Western comedy movie directed by  Michele Lupo.

Plot
Just out of jail, Ben (Giuliano Gemma) finds his old buddy Charlie (George Eastman), an adventurer from peanuts who ekes out a living as a card cheat. The two make common cause, but soon the problems begin...

Cast
 Giuliano Gemma: Ben Bellew 
 George Eastman: Charlie Logan 
 Marisa Mell: Sarah 
 Vittorio Congia: Alan Smith 
 Giacomo Rossi Stuart: Hawkins, Pinkerton detective 
 Luciano Catenacci: Kurt  
 Remo Capitani: Charro 
 Giovanni Pazzafini: Butch
 Aldo Sambrell: Sheriff Walkers

Releases
The film was released in Italy on February 22, 1972.

Wild East released the film in its original widescreen aspect ratio on an out-of-print limited edition Region 0 DVD on 8/4/05. The DVD also contains an alternate title sequence with a different theme song.

Notes

External links
 
 

1972 films
1970s buddy comedy films
1970s Western (genre) comedy films
Spaghetti Western films
1970s Italian-language films
Films directed by Michele Lupo
Italian buddy comedy films
Films shot in Almería
1972 comedy films
Films with screenplays by Sergio Donati
1970s Italian films